Cynthia Dawn Margolis (born October 1, 1965) is an American glamour spokesmodel and actress.

Personal life 

Margolis was born in Los Angeles, California, the daughter of Karyn O. (née Cleere) and William C. Margolis. According to an interview in Playboy, her career began with a business class project on greeting cards at the California State University at Northridge, where she produced cards with a photograph of herself wearing lingerie and including her phone number.

Margolis was raised Jewish. She was married to restaurateur Guy Starkman. Following in-vitro fertility treatment, she gave birth to son Nicholas Isaac in 2002. Twin daughters Sabrina and Sierra were born in 2005 with the incubation of a surrogate mother. Margolis and her husband separated in 2008.

Career

Margolis’ modeling career took off when agents started asking about the woman on the cards. She has modeled in advertising for companies such as Reebok, Vidal Sassoon, Coors, Frederick's of Hollywood, Hanes, and Sunkist. She was Miss Makita Power Tools 1986 and did appearances at woodworking trade shows.

Among late night television viewers, she is best known as an infomercial co-presenter including work with Tony Robbins and Don Lapre. Margolis also appeared briefly as one of Barker's Beauties in 1995 on the game show The Price Is Right. She also appeared as a fembot in the movie Austin Powers: International Man of Mystery. On September 16 1999 she appeared on an episode of WWE Smackdown in a segment where she received a figure-four leglock from Jeff Jarrett. She had a late night Saturday talk show in 2000 called The Cindy Margolis Show, which was filmed in Miami Beach, Florida.

Margolis emerged as a star in the early days of the internet. She was named Yahoo! Internet Life magazine's "Queen of the Internet" from 1996 to 1999. She also found her way into the 2000 Guinness Book of World Records as a result of being the "most downloaded" person in 1999. At the peak of her popularity, images of Margolis were downloaded 70,000 times in a span of 24 hours.

In November 2005, Margolis teamed up with the World Poker Tour to become the new hostess for Chipleaders. In an April 2006 interview with The Washington Post, Margolis discussed her nude photo session for the December 2006 issue of Playboy, saying that she had posed for Playboy many times in the past, but never completely nude. She cited her good looks at age 40 and wanting to be an inspiration to mothers and women her age as the reason she chose to finally pose nude. "It will be fun to go up against the 20-year-olds and show them that they don't have anything on me!" she told the Associated Press. In an interview with EXTRA! magazine she said that the television show Desperate Housewives had been an inspiration for her as it showed that mothers her age could also be fit and sexy. A portion of the proceeds from the issues sold were pledged go to a charity for which Margolis is a spokeswoman, "Resolve". This charity aims to get fertility treatment better covered by insurance companies.

Margolis posed for a second Playboy pictorial for the July 2008 issue. A portion of the sales of her issue went to her charity, the Cindy Margolis Get a Download of This Fertility Fund. She was very proud to have posed, stating:

 

In 2006, she was the winner of NBC's Celebrity Cooking Showdown. She teamed up with celebrity chef Wolfgang Puck to win both the first and final rounds. In 2008, she was to perform as a magician on CBS's Secret Talents of the Stars, but didn't get the chance when the show was cancelled after only one episode was made. Later that year, production began on a new Fox Reality Channel original series, Seducing Cindy, a dating reality show in which male contestants, aged 18–49, battled to win the affection of Margolis. The show premiered on January 30, 2010.

Poker
Margolis played as an amateur in the Pro Am Equalizer poker tournament against fellow amateur Jeremy Sisto and professionals Howard Lederer, Jennifer Harman, Phil Laak and Chris Ferguson.

Filmography 

 Austin Powers: International Man of Mystery (1997) .... Fembot
 Chairman of the Board (1998) .... Tennis Instructor
 WWE Smackdown (1999) .... Herself
 The Cindy Margolis Show (2000) TV Series .... Host
 Ally McBeal (2001) .... Herself
 MADtv (2001) .... McHooters restaurant hostess (Cameo)
 Dead Above Ground (2002) .... Kari McClure Mallory
 Sol Goode (2003) .... Angie
 Seducing Cindy (2010) .... Reality television show
 Beverly Hills Nannies (2012) .... Reality television show
  Bad Publicity (2015)...scripted TV series...Cindy Holiday
  Isle of Legends (2015) (film)....Cynthia Hale
 Sharknado 3 (2015) ...Herself

References

External links

 
 
 Exclusive Cindy Margolis Interview at TrulyHollywood.com

1965 births
Actresses from Los Angeles
American film actresses
American Internet celebrities
California State University, Northridge alumni
Game show models
Glamour models
Jewish American actresses
Living people
Participants in American reality television series
Jewish female models
21st-century American Jews
21st-century American women